Freddie Norwood (born February 14, 1970) is an American professional boxer. Known as "Lil Hagler", Norwood defeated Antonio Cermeño to win the WBA Featherweight Title in 1998. He successfully defended his title eight times before losing his title by a controversial 11th-round TKO to Derrick Gainer. Among his notable defenses were a 9th-round KO over former WBC featherweight champion Takashi Koshimoto, a unanimous decision victory over former WBO featherweight champ Julio Pablo Chacón, and future IBF and WBA Featherweight titleholder Juan Manuel Márquez. After losing his title to Gainer, Norwood retired from boxing, age 30.  Eight years later he made a comeback and had another 8 fights winning 5, and finally retiring age 41.
(see below)

Professional boxing record

External links
 

1970 births
Living people
Boxers from St. Louis
Featherweight boxers
World featherweight boxing champions
World Boxing Association champions
American male boxers